Tawes is a surname. It is also applied to some buildings.

People
 J. Millard Tawes, 54th Governor of Maryland in the United States from 1959 to 1967.

Geography

Places

Wales
 Tawe Valley, one of the South Wales Valleys.
 River Tawe (Welsh: Afon Tawe) a river in South Wales. 
 Tawe Uchaf a community in the Brecknockshire district of Powys, Wales.
 Tawe barrage in Swansea, Wales.

Buildings

United States
 Hytche Athletic Center - formerly known as J. Millard Tawes Gym
 Capt. Leonard Tawes House, a historic home located at Crisfield, Maryland.
 J. Millard Tawes Historical Museum, a museum located in Crisfield, Maryland.

Wales
 Tawes Theatre, also known as the Tawes Fine Arts Building and Tawes Hall, the home of the Department of English at the University of Maryland.
 Parc Tawe, a retail park and leisure area in Swansea, Wales

Other
 Tawe Valley Disturbance, a geological structure in Wales, UK.